During the Parade of Nations at the opening ceremony of the 2008 Summer Paralympic Games, athletes from each participating country paraded in the stadium, preceded by their flag. The flag was borne by a sportsperson from that country chosen either by the National Paralympic Committee or by the athletes themselves to represent their country. It is considered a great honour to bear the country's flag in the Parade of Nations.

Parade order
Per tradition, the host country, in this case the People's Republic of China, marched last however contrary to tradition in the Olympic Games the national team of Greece did not enter first. All other nations marched in name order in the language of the host nation, which in this case is the Chinese language. As Chinese is written in characters and not letters, the order of the teams' entry was determined by the number of strokes in the first character of their respective countries' Simplified Chinese names.   Countries with the same number of strokes in the first character are sorted by those of the next character. This made Guinea (几内亚) the first country to enter, as it takes two strokes to write the first character in the country's name (几), and Zambia (赞比亚) last-but-one, ahead of China.

List
The following is a list of each country's flag bearer.

See also
 2008 Summer Olympics national flag bearers

Sources
 Official list on the website of the International Paralympic Committee

References

Flag bearers
Lists of Paralympic flag bearers